Glia-activating factor is a protein that in humans is encoded by the FGF9 gene.

Function 

The protein encoded by this gene is a member of the fibroblast growth factor (FGF) family. FGF family members possess broad mitogenic and cell survival activities, and are involved in a variety of biological processes, including embryonic development, cell growth, morphogenesis, tissue repair, tumor growth and invasion. This protein was isolated as a secreted factor that exhibits a growth-stimulating effect on cultured glial cells. In nervous system, this protein is produced mainly by neurons and may be important for glial cell development. Expression of the mouse homolog of this gene was found to be dependent on Sonic hedgehog (Shh) signaling. Mice lacking the homolog gene displayed a male-to-female sex reversal phenotype, which suggested a role in testicular embryogenesis. This gene is involved in the patterning of sex determination, lung development, and skeletal development.

Sex determination 

FGF9 has also been shown to play a vital role in male sex development. FGF9’s role in sex determination begins with its expression in the bi-potent gonads for both females and males. Once activated by SOX9, it is responsible for forming a feedforward loop with Sox9, increasing the levels of both genes. It forms a positive feedback loop upregulating SOX9, while simultaneously inactivating the female Wnt4 signaling pathway.

Lung development 

In lung development, FGF9 is expressed in the mesothelium and pulmonary epithelium, where its purpose is to retain lung mesenchymal proliferation. Inactivation of FGF9 results in diminished epithelial branching. By the end of gestation, the lungs that are developed cannot sustain life and will result in a prenatal death.

Skeletal development 

Another biological role presented by this gene is its involvement in skeletal development and repair. FGF9 and FGF18 both stimulate chondrocyte proliferation. FGF9 heterozygous mutant mice had a compromised bone repair after an injury with less expression of VEGF and VEGFR2 and lower osteoclast recruitment.  One disease associated with this gene is multiple synostoses syndrome (SYNS), a rare bone disease that has to do with the fusion of the fingers and toes. A missense mutation in the second exon of the FGF9 gene, the S99N mutation, seems to be the third cause of SYNS. A mutation in Noggin (NOG) and the Growth Differentiation Factor 5 (GDF5) are the other two causes of SYNS. The S99N mutation results in cell signaling irregularities that interfere with chondrogenesis and osteogenesis causing the fusion of the joints during development.

Overexpression of FGF9 
FGF9 is a gene within the larger family of fibroblast growth factors (FGF), a type of cell signaling protein. This gene signals embryonic stem cell development and sex determination. FGF9 gene expression is also essential for development of the prostate and maintaining prostate tissue homeostasis. The prostate is a male reproductive organ that is composed of epithelial and stromal cells. Overexpression of FGF9 in prostate epithelial cells can lead to high grade prostate intraepithelial neoplasia, which is a precursor for prostate cancer. Additionally, high expression of the gene in prostate epithelial cells disrupts prostate tissue homeostasis, and promotes a high frequency of metastasis. On the other hand, overexpression of FGF9 in the alternate, prostate stromal cells, promotes the communication with prostate cancer cells. 

It has been reported that abnormal expression of FGF9 has oncogenic effects in various human cancers including; ovarian, brain, lung, and colon cancers. In studies with mice, high expression of FGF9 resulted in fusion of the prostate and seminal vesicles, and penis protrusion. More importantly, it caused hyperplasia in both stromal and epithelial compartments. Due to the enlargement of tissue caused by an increase in the reproduction rate of its cells, hyperplasia is frequently the primary stage in the development of cancer. 

Although several studies have proven that high expression of FGF9 correlates to the progression of prostate cancer, the question of whether overexpression of FGF9 initiates prostate tumorigenesis is still being tested.

Interactions 

FGF9 has been shown to interact with Fibroblast growth factor receptor 3.

References

Further reading